Ryan Robinson (born 13 October 1982) is an English footballer who plays as a goalkeeper.

Career
Born in Kendal, Cumbria, Robinson began his career with Blackburn Rovers, before being released in 2001, aged 20. He joined Southend United, where he got his first taste of first-team action, playing in two Football League games. He was released by Southend after one year, and has since played for a number of Conference clubs – Morecambe, Southport and, since 2006, Forest Green.

Robinson moved near to his family home when he joined Morecambe. He quickly made the goalkeeper jersey his own through a series of excellent displays. However, after being injured Morecambe brought in loan keeper Steven Drench from nearby Blackburn Rovers. Drench similarly excelled and took Robinson's first-team spot.

Following an injury to Drench, Robinson again took his place as first team goalkeeper. However a poor game saw him spend the remainder of the season on the bench. At the end of the 2005–06 season Drench signed for Morecambe and Robinson, unhappy at playing second fiddle, was allowed to leave and was quickly snapped up by former Morecambe manager Jim Harvey who had just taken over at Forest Green Rovers.

After two seasons at The New Lawn Robinson dropped into semi professional football when he signed for Bath City in May 2009 after Forest Green failed to offer him a new contract.

Robinson struggled for fitness for the early part of the 2009–10 season with Bath however after shaking off a back problem he began to feature regularly for Bath including a 2–1 FA Cup second round defeat to his former side, Forest Green in November 2009.

In May 2010, Robinson kept a clean sheet in the Conference South play-off final to help earn Bath City promotion to the Conference National with a 1–0 victory over Woking. Following a season back in the top flight of non-league football, Robinsonw was released at the end of the 2010–11 season.

Robinson featured as a triallist in a game for Cheltenham Town against Cirencester Town on 9 July 2011 however was not in contention to win a contract as Cheltenham boss Mark Yates already had a signing lined up ahead of Robinson. He also featured again as a triallist with Worcester City in July 2011 in a game against Pershore Town.

In August 2011, Robinson made his debut for Evo Stik Southern Premier Division club Evesham United in a game against Oxford City. Robinson also joined Conference side, AFC Telford United in September 2011 as a backup goalkeeper on non-contract terms. He was released by the club in May 2012.

The following month he joined Northwich Victoria.

Honours
Bath City
Conference South Play-off Winner: 1
 2009–10

References

External links

1982 births
Living people
Sportspeople from Kendal
Footballers from Cumbria
English footballers
Association football goalkeepers
Blackburn Rovers F.C. players
Southend United F.C. players
Morecambe F.C. players
Southport F.C. players
Forest Green Rovers F.C. players
Bath City F.C. players
AFC Telford United players
Evesham United F.C. players
Northwich Victoria F.C. players
Kendal Town F.C. players
English Football League players
National League (English football) players